Kickaroo is a 1921 American short silent Western film directed by Albert Russell and featuring Hoot Gibson.

Cast
 Hoot Gibson
 Gertrude Olmstead
 Otto Nelson
 Ben Corbett

See also
 Hoot Gibson filmography

External links
 

1921 films
1921 Western (genre) films
1921 short films
American silent short films
American black-and-white films
Films directed by Albert Russell
Silent American Western (genre) films
1920s American films